Biryukov and Biryukova (feminine) is a common Russian surname derived from the word "бирюк" (lone wolf).

People with this surname include:
Alex Biryukov, cryptographer
Vladimir Pavlovich Biryukov (1888–1971), folklorist
Vladimir Afanasyevich Biryukov (1933–2021), Russian politician
Igors Birjukovs (born 1986), Latvian hockey player
Mikhail Biryukov (disambiguation), several people
Vladislav Biryukov, (born 1972), Russian mineralogist and journalist
 (1908—1976), Soviet Russian composer.
 (1940–2011), Ukrainian artist, author emblem of Zhytomyr
Yury Biryukov (born 1948), Russian lawyer and politician
Yury Biryukov (volunteer) (born 1974) Ukrainian volunteer, founder of "Wings Phoenix"
Anna Biryukova (born 1967), Soviet and Russian triple jumper
Svetlana Biryukova (born 1991), Russian long jumper
Nikolai Biryukov (1901-1980), Soviet general
Anatoly Biryukov (fl. 1977), Soviet serial killer
Denis Biryukov (born 1988), Russian volleyball player

See also
Biryukov is also the name of several rural localities in Russia

References

Russian-language surnames